Argania (Tashelhit: ⴰⵔⴳⴰⵏ Argan) is a genus of flowering plants containing the sole species Argania spinosa, known as argan, a tree endemic to the calcareous semidesert Sous valley of southwestern Morocco and to the region of Tindouf in southwestern Algeria. They are thorny, with gnarled trunks and wide spreading crown.

The flowers are small, with five pale yellow-green petals; flowering in April. This surrounds the very hard nut, which contains one (occasionally two or three) small, oil-rich seeds. The fruit takes over a year to mature, ripening in June to July of the following year.

Name
The scientific name Argania is derived from argan, the name of the tree in Shilha, the Berber language which is spoken by the majority of the people living in the areas where the tree is endemic. Shilha Berber has a rich vocabulary for the various parts of the fruit, its stages of ripeness, and its harvesting and processing. The oil is also called argan. In medieval Arabic pharmacological sources, the tree is known as harjān, a distortion of the Berber word argan.

United Nations International Day
On March 3, 2021, the United Nations General Assembly adopted a resolution to proclaim May 10th the International Day of Argania, an observance to be celebrated annually. Amongst the motivations for this proclamation were the importance of Argania to sustainable development in areas where it is endemic. The UN resolution was submitted by Morocco, and was co-sponsored by 113 member states of the United Nations before being adopted by consensus.

Cultivation

Their area has shrunk by about half during the last 100 years, due to charcoal making, grazing, and increasingly intensive cultivation. The best hope for the conservation of the trees may lie in the recent development of a thriving export market for argan oil as a high-value product. However, the wealth brought by argan oil export has also created threats to argan trees in the form of increased goat population. Locals use the newfound wealth to buy more goats and the goats stunt the growth of the argan trees by climbing up and eating their leaves and fruit. It is reported that the display of the tree climbing goats is staged or faked in areas popular with tourists, as the goats only very infrequently climb the trees without human intervention.

Argan is also grown in the Arabah and Negev regions of Israel.

Uses
In some parts of Morocco, argan takes the place of the olive as a source of forage, oil, timber, and fuel in Berber society. 

Especially near Essaouira, the argan tree is frequently climbed by goats.

Fruit
Argan fruit falls in July, when they are black and dry. Until this happens, goats are kept out of the argan woodlands by wardens. Rights to collect the fruit are controlled by law and village traditions. The "nuts" are gathered after fruit consumption and spat out by ruminating goats. Seeds being spat out by the goats constitutes one mechanism of seed dispersal.

Argan oil

Argan oil is produced by several women's co-operatives in the southwestern parts of Morocco. The most labor-intensive part of oil-extraction is removal of the soft pulp (used to feed animals) and the cracking by hand, between two stones, of the hard nut. The seeds are then removed and gently roasted. This roasting accounts for part of the oil's distinctive, nutty flavor.

The traditional technique for oil extraction is to grind the roasted seeds to paste, with a little water, in a stone rotary quern. The paste is then squeezed by hand to extract the oil. The extracted paste is still oil-rich and is used as animal feed. Oil produced this way can be stored and used for 3–6 months, and can be produced as needed from kernels, which can keep for 20 years unopened. Dry-pressing is becoming increasingly important for oil produced for sale, as this method allows for faster extraction, and the oil produced can be used for 12–18 months after extraction.

The oil contains 80% unsaturated fatty acids, is rich in essential fatty acids, and is more resistant to oxidation than olive oil. Argan oil is used for dipping bread, on couscous and salads, and for other similar uses. A dip for bread known as amlou is made from argan oil, almonds, and peanuts, sometimes sweetened by honey or sugar. The unroasted oil is traditionally used as a treatment for skin diseases, and has become favoured by European cosmetics manufacturers.

Argan oil is sold in Morocco as a luxury item. Sales of the product have grown since being marketed by the cosmetics industry in the US and Europe in the early 21st century. Its price is notable compared to other oils.

Argan oil contains:
 46% Oleic acid
 32% Linoleic acid 
 12% Palmitic acid
 6% Stearic acid

Animal feed
Argan trees are a major source of forage for sheep, goats, camels and cattle. Fruits and leaves are readily consumed by livestock. The press cake resulting from oil extraction can also be sun dried and fed to ruminants. Bees can nest in argan trees, making them sites for wild honey harvesting.

References

External links

 
 
 
 
 
 Kitty Morse, Ardent for Argan, 2004, Saudi Aramco World

Sapotoideae
Monotypic Ericales genera
Edible nuts and seeds
Crops originating from Africa
Forages
Drought-tolerant trees
Trees of Mediterranean climate
Trees of Morocco
Trees of Algeria
Masterpieces of the Oral and Intangible Heritage of Humanity
Sapotaceae genera